Channelcast is a British podcast produced by ITV News that covers news events in the Channel Islands.

It was originally presented by ITV political correspondent Clare Burton, and Gary Burgess until his death in 2022. Several editions of the podcast have been published to tie-in with major regional news stories, fronted by various ITV Channel presenters.

Each episode runs for approximately 30–40 minutes, featuring in-depth analysis and insight into the news stories making headlines in the region.

Guests have included Guernsey's Chief Minister, Gavin St Pier, and Jersey's Health Minister, Richard Renouf, who took part in a panel debate as the island became the first place in the British Isles to legalise the principle of assisted dying.

Over the series' original run, presenter Gary Burgess also opened up about his terminal cancer diagnosis.

See also 
 ITV Channel Television
 Political podcast

References

2020 in radio
2020 podcast debuts
Audio podcasts
British podcasts
Political podcasts